Ariza is a surname. Notable people with the name include:

Amilkar Ariza (born 1943), Colombian painter and sculptor
Juan Ariza (1816–1876), Spanish novelist, poet, and playwright
Juan Esteban Ariza Mendoza (1928-2006), Dominican lawyer, diplomat, and poet
Julio Ariza (born 1957), Spanish entrepreneur
Mayerli Buitrago Ariza (born 1986), Colombian shot putter
Natalia Ariza (born 1991), Colombian footballer
Óscar Ariza (born 1999), Venezuelan diver
Patricia Ariza (born 1948), Colombian poet, playwright, and actor
René Ariza (1940–1994), Cuban actor, director, and playwright
Tatiana Ariza (born 1991), Colombian footballer
Trevor Ariza (born 1985), American basketball player

See also
Araiza, surname